Rotimlja is a village in the municipality of Stolac in the Herzegovina-Neretva Canton of the Federation of Bosnia and Herzegovina in Bosnia and Herzegovina.

Demographics 
According to the 2013 census, its population was 683.

References

Populated places in Stolac
Villages in the Federation of Bosnia and Herzegovina